Paul Klee (1879–1940) was a German-Swiss painter.

Klee or KLEE may also refer to:
 KLEE, an American radio station
 Klee (band), a German pop band
 Klee (surname), a surname (including a list of people with the surname)
 Klee Passage, a channel of water in the Marshall Islands
 KLEE-TV, a Houston TV channel now KPRC-TV
 10543 Klee (1992 DL4), a main-belt asteroid
 Leesburg International Airport (ICAO code:KLEE)
 Klee, A character from the video game Genshin Impact voiced by Misaki Kuno

See also
 
 Clee (disambiguation)